Masena Moke (born 6 February 1980) is a former football forward from the Democratic Republic of Congo who last played for Bulgarian club Vihren Sandanski.

Moke has played for PFC CSKA Sofia, PFC Beroe Stara Zagora, PFC Cherno More Varna and Vihren Sandanski in the Bulgarian A PFG.

References

1980 births
Living people
Association football forwards
Democratic Republic of the Congo footballers
First Professional Football League (Bulgaria) players
PFC Cherno More Varna players
Expatriate footballers in Bulgaria
PFC Beroe Stara Zagora players
PFC CSKA Sofia players
Primeira Liga players
Gil Vicente F.C. players
Expatriate footballers in Portugal
Democratic Republic of the Congo expatriate footballers
Democratic Republic of the Congo expatriate sportspeople in Portugal
21st-century Democratic Republic of the Congo people